Arctohyalopoa is a genus of grass in the family Poaceae. It is native to the eastern Russian oblasts of Krasnoyarsk, Sakha, and Zabaykalsky Krai.

Taxonomy 
Arctohyalopoa was first described in the scientific journal Taxon by the authors Martin Röser and Natalia Tkach in 2020. The genus Arctohyalopoa consists of four species: A. ivanovae, A. jurtzevii, A. lanatiflora, and A. momica. Its type species is A. lanatiflora, which was originally described as Poa lanatiflora in 1932.

References 

Pooideae
Poaceae genera